Kurucahüyük is a village in the Nizip District, Gaziantep Province, Turkey. The village is inhabited by Turkmens of the Barak and Elbegli tribes.

References

Villages in Nizip District